Gong Chan-sik (born August 14, 1993), better known by his stage name Gongchan, is a South Korean singer and actor. He is a member of the South Korean boy group B1A4, formed under the label WM Entertainment.

Career

Pre-debut
Gongchan was discovered on Cyworld as a result of his winning of an "Eoljjang Challenge" when he was in middle school. He was also a runner-up of a cross-dressing contest, where he danced to a song by soloist Ivy.  He then underwent a training period of two years.

B1A4
After years of training, Gongchan joined as a vocalist and the youngest member of B1A4. On April 11, 2011, WM Entertainment revealed Gongchan as the third member after releasing the news of B1A4 along with Jinyoung and Baro's pictures. Sandeul and CNU were revealed in the next two days.

On April 20, 2011, B1A4 released their debut Track "OK" and mini album "Let's Fly", making their debut on April 23, 2011 on MBC Show! Music Core.

After their debut, B1A4 was invited to star in MTV's reality show Match Up with Block B. As one of the projects for the show, B1A4 filmed a music video for "Only Learned Bad Things" (못된 것만 배워서).

A Song For You
In 2015, Gongchan became one of the new MCs on the fourth season of KBS A Song For You. He appeared alongside two other MC's f(x)'s Amber and Kangin.

I Need Romance
It was announced in early 2017 that Gongchan would star as the first main character for the new mobile game, I Need Romance, developed by Take One Company. The game, a first-person virtual reality simulation dating game, has Gongchan in the role of Eun Sehyun, a top-idol and leader of the boy group Don't Touch for 5 years who is known as the representative 'chic-idol'. He interacts with the user, who plays the opposing main character.

Personal life 
Gongchan was confirmed by WM to be exempted from mandatory military service due to health reasons.

Filmography

Film

Television

Web series

Video Games

Variety shows

References

External links
  

1993 births
Japanese-language singers
Living people
People from Suncheon
South Korean male idols
South Korean male singers
South Korean pop singers
South Korean male rappers
South Korean male television actors
School of Performing Arts Seoul alumni
B1A4 members
WM Entertainment artists